Clarysville is an unincorporated community and census-designated place (CDP) in Allegany County, Maryland, United States. As of the 2010 census it had a population of 73.

It is located along U.S. Route 40 Alternate at its intersection with Maryland Route 55.

Clarysville was known around the region for the Clarysville Inn, a historic building which stood from 1807 until it burned in 1999. During the American Civil War, the inn served as a military hospital, treating wounded soldiers.

The exit of the Hoffman drainage tunnel, constructed to drain several coal mines, is near Clarysville.

Demographics

References

Census-designated places in Allegany County, Maryland
Census-designated places in Maryland
Populated places in the Cumberland, MD-WV MSA
Cumberland, MD-WV MSA